Tayo Jarrett (born 5 April 1986), better known as Scorcher, is a British grime MC, songwriter and actor from Enfield, London. He was previously a member of the grime collective The Movement and is signed to Blue Colla Music.

Career

2005–08: Early career
He began his career in Cold Blooded where he became known for his "shank" bars, and would regularly attend pirate radio and work his way up through the North London grime circuit. Scorcher served a short prison sentence in 2006 for driving offences, and while in jail his mixtape Simply the Best was released and was greeted with good reviews from the grime scene. After an incident with fellow Cold Blooded member Cookie, Scorcher left Cold Blooded to concentrate on a new collective known as The Movement, which featured Scorcher alongside Wretch 32, Devlin, Mercston, and Ghetts. At this point he was involved in a momentous clash that saw him and fellow movement members go up against rival grime collective Boy Better Know. Scorcher did three dubs directed at Wiley, Jammer and Frisco. Scorcher also produces beats, and Thunder Power was a release entirely his own production. He has produced beats such as 'Way Down The Road', 'Beef with T', 'Igloo Remix', 'Talk of the Ghetto' and others which have been big through the year of 2006. Scorcher won an Official Mixtape Award for best producer in 2009 and was also nominated for best Grime mixtape of 2010.

2009–10: Concrete Jungle and Geffen

Concrete Jungle is a 2009 debut album by Scorcher released independently. The album is seen as a critical success in electronic music, but a major disappointment to grime fans. The albums has spawned two singles, "I Know" and "Lipsin' Ting", neither of which charted. The albums has been widely anticipated by many in the grime scene, but disappointed many in the scene. It features collaborations with the likes of Wiley, J2K, and Wretch 32. The album was inspired by a short freestyle by Scorcher. The third single from the album is "Dark Knight". His debut single, "It's My Time", charted on the UK R&B chart at number 38. When Geffen's MD left for Sony and the bigger artist moved to other labels within Universal, Scorcher's deal was ended.

2011–2014: Blue Colla and acting career
In 2011, Scorcher began an acting career and played the major role of Kamale, in the 2011 Channel 4 drama, Top Boy. "Making the transition from music to acting hasn't really been that hard for me, as you get used to performing its just performance in a different setting." He described his character as sinister, and an all-out bad man and is working with other rappers such as Ashley Walters, Kano and other first time actors. He has also played a part in the movie Offender which was released on 24 December 2012. After being released from Geffen Records in 2011, Scorcher was signed to independent label Blue Colla Music in 2012 and his first single of the year "It's All Love" premiered on MistaJam's 1XTRA show on 3 March 2012.

2015–present: The Intent and return to music
In 2016, Scorcher signed to RU Listening Limited. He, Scorcher starred in the 2016 film The Intent in which he plays small-time criminal called Hoodz, who finds success in robbing stores and small businesses, and finally catches the jackpot by attacking a big drug dealer for his stash of money and drugs. He played the role of Diesel in the film Road (2017). 

He returned to music in 2019 and released the singles "Gargoyle", "Could Be Worse", "9", "Sandpit" and was featured on the track "Hunnids" by Tizzy x Brandz. In October 2019 Scorcher attended the Christian Louboutin Palace Nights Collection Launch.

Discography

Studio albums
2009: Concrete Jungle

Mixtapes
2006: Simply The Best
2006: Tempo Specialists [w/The Movement]
2007: Leader of the New School
2007: Thunder Power
2008: Simply The Best 2
2010: Jungle Book
2011: Audio Wave
2012: Simply The Best 3
2014: 1 of 1
2016: Rocket x Scorcher EP [w/Rocket]

Guest appearances

Filmography

Film
Offender (2012) - Essay
The Intent (2016) - Hoodz
 Road (2017) - Diesel

Television
Top Boy (2011) - Kamale (season 1)
You Don't Know Me (2021) - Spooks

Personal life
Following the Death of Mark Duggan by Police in 2011, which resulted in the 2011 England riots, Scorcher revealed via Twitter that his grandmother was Cynthia Jarret, a 49-year-old Afro-Caribbean woman who was killed by Police on 5 October 1985 during the search of her home. Together with the death of Cherry Groce the previous week (which caused the 1985 Brixton riot, her death is credited with being one of the main causes of the Broadwater Farm riot the following day.

"[sic]25 years ago police killed my grandma in her house in Tottenham and the whole ends rioted, 25 years on and they're still keepin up fuckry. Police R here 2 uphold the law & protect us leadin by example so wen they stop upholdin the law its natural reaction 4 there 2 B lawlessness."

Scorcher is a supporter of Tottenham Hotspur F.C.

Notes

External links

1986 births
Living people
Black British male rappers
English people of Nigerian descent
People from Enfield, London
Grime music artists
English male rappers
Rappers from London
English people of Jamaican descent